Bennett Joseph Savage (born September 13, 1980) is an American actor. He played the lead role of Cory Matthews on the ABC sitcom Boy Meets World (1993–2000) and its Disney Channel sequel Girl Meets World (2014–2017).

Personal life
Savage was born in Chicago, Illinois, to Joanne and Lewis Savage (1946–2015), who worked as an industrial real estate broker and a consultant. His elder brother is actor and director Fred Savage, and his elder sister is actress and musician Kala Savage. His grandparents were Jewish and from Poland, Ukraine, Germany, and Latvia, and Savage was raised in Reform Judaism.

Savage married Tessa Angermeier in February 2023.

Career

Acting 
Savage made his film debut at the age of 9 in his elder brother Fred Savage's Little Monsters (1989) and appeared in the feature films Big Girls Don't Cry... They Get Even (1992), as Sam, the brainy little brother, and as a 10-year-old in Clifford (1994), the latter starring Martin Short. Savage's stage debut was in The Laughter Epidemic at the Pasadena Playhouse. He also guest starred on his brother Fred's TV series The Wonder Years in the season three episode "The St. Valentine's Day Massacre" as a cupid-esque character named Curtis Hartsell.

His first significant speaking role on network television was playing the recurring role of Matthew, son of the Judd Hirsch character, on the comedy series Dear John (1988). He was one of a family of orphans who con Robert Mitchum into being their guardian in A Family for Joe (NBC, 1990).

Savage is best known for his role as lead character Cory Matthews on the hit TV sitcom Boy Meets World from 1993 until 2000. Savage's brother Fred appeared alongside him in one episode, guest starring as a lecherous college professor pursuing Cory's girlfriend. In the following season, Fred directed his brother and the cast in the episode "Family Trees," as Shawn (Rider Strong) discovers that the woman who raised him is not his biological mother.

Savage has also worked in several TV movies, including She Woke Up (1992) with Lindsay Wagner and McDonald's Family Theatre Presents: Aliens for Breakfast (1995), as a young teen whose breakfast cereal figure comes alive.

Savage received critical recognition for his portrayal of Coty Wyckoff, an angel-faced boy with the soul of a killer, in the ABC Event Series, Wild Palms (1993).

In May 1998, Savage again received critical acclaim, this time for playing Roddy Stern in Tony Award-winner Israel Horovitz's rarely seen play Unexpected Tenderness at the Marilyn Monroe Theater. He received an Ovation Award for his performance.

In 2002, Savage starred in the film Swimming Upstream playing the best friend who was slightly immature but very supportive of his terminally ill friend.

Savage took a break from acting in both film and television for three years, but he later made a guest appearance in Still Standing as Seth Cosella, the boss of Bill Miller, played by Mark Addy. That same year he starred as Ford Davis in the independent feature Car Babes, which was shot on location in Los Gatos, California, and also guest starred as himself in an episode of the Disney Channel original series Phil of the Future.

In 2006, he starred in the critically acclaimed independent film Palo Alto, which first premiered at the Tribeca Film Festival in 2007.

In 2008, he starred as Mark Ratner in an episode of the NBC series Chuck, as well as a murder suspect Kirby Morris in an episode of Without a Trace.

In 2011, he appeared in an episode of the Fox series Bones. He also guest starred on the Disney Channel series Shake It Up playing Andy Burns.

In November 2012, Savage announced via his Twitter account that he had signed on to the Boy Meets World spin-off series, Girl Meets World. The series premiered on the Disney Channel on June 27, 2014, and features Savage's character Cory and his Boy Meets World love interest Topanga (Danielle Fishel) married in their adult years with two children. The series follows Cory and Topanga's daughter Riley (Rowan Blanchard) as she enters middle school and tries to navigate through life. Besides being Riley's father, Cory is also her history teacher in this series; in addition to his on-screen role, Savage directed some episodes. The series was canceled after three seasons on January 5, 2017, with the final episode airing on January 20.

Savage has, on three occasions, portrayed younger versions of characters played by Mandy Patinkin in flashback scenes. In 2015 and 2020 in Criminal Minds, and in 2020 in Homeland.

In 2022, Savage was cast in the Lifetime film Girl in the Shed: The Kidnapping of Abby Hernandez as part of its "Ripped from the Headlines" feature film where he portrays Nathaniel Kibby.

Politics 
Savage interned for U.S. Senator Arlen Specter (R–PA) in 2003 as a requirement for completing his studies at Stanford University, where he graduated in 2004 with a degree in political science and as a member of the Sigma Chi fraternity.

In August 2022, Savage qualified as a candidate for the West Hollywood City Council. He was not elected for one of the three at-large positions. In March 2023, Savage announced his campaign as a Democrat for California's 30th congressional district, currently held by Adam Schiff, who is retiring to run for United States Senate.

Filmography

Film

Television

Awards and nominations

References

External links
 

1980 births
Living people
20th-century American Jews
20th-century American male actors
21st-century American Jews
21st-century American male actors
American male child actors
American male film actors
American male television actors
American people of German-Jewish descent
American people of Latvian descent
American people of Latvian-Jewish descent
American people of Polish-Jewish descent
American people of Ukrainian-Jewish descent
Jewish American male actors
Male actors from Chicago
Candidates in the 2024 United States House of Representatives elections